USS Active (YT-112) was acquired by the US Navy from the United States Shipping Board on 20 April 1925 and placed in service at New York on 27 April 1925. The harbor tug spent her entire 21-year naval career serving the 3rd Naval District from her base in New York harbor. She was placed out of service on 5 June 1946, and her name was struck from the Navy list on 19 June 1946. Though her fate is not known for certain, her age and length of service would suggest that she was sold for scrap soon thereafter.

References
 
 NavSource Online: Active (YT-112 / YTM-112)

Tugs of the United States Navy
Ships built in San Francisco